Thomas Cousins (born 3 March 1981) is a British former judoka, who won a silver medal at the 2002 Commonwealth Games.

Judo career
At the 2002 Commonwealth Games in Manchester, Cousins won the silver medal in the under 81kg category, in the gold medal match he was defeated by Scotland's Graeme Randall.

He became the champion of Great Britain, winning the half-middleweight division at the British Judo Championships in 2004.

Personal life
His twin brother Peter Cousins is also a British judoka, who competed at the Olympic Games. Thomas is a coach at the West Essex Judo Club.

References

External links
 
 

1981 births
Living people
English male judoka
Commonwealth Games silver medallists for England
Judoka at the 2002 Commonwealth Games
Commonwealth Games medallists in judo
Medallists at the 2002 Commonwealth Games